Cantharus vermeiji is a species of sea snail, a marine gastropod mollusk in the family Pisaniidae, the true whelks.

Description

Distribution

References

 Fraussen K. 2008. Cantharus vermeiji sp. nov., a new species from East Africa (Gastropoda: Buccinidae). Gloria Maris, 47(1-2): 24-29

External links

Pisaniidae
Gastropods described in 2008